Legson Didimu Kayira ( – 14 October 2012) was a Malawian novelist. An ethnic Tumbuka, he received an education at Skagit Valley College, University of Washington and St Catharine's College, Cambridge. His early works focused on Malawi's rural life, while his later writings satirised the Hastings Banda regime.

Biography
Kayira was born in Mpale, a village in northern Nyasaland (now Malawi); the precise date was not recorded. Soon after his birth, his mother threw him into the Didimu River as she could not afford to feed him. He was rescued and acquired the name "Didimu". He himself added the English-sounding name "Legson" when he was in primary school. From primary school, Kayira was awarded a place at Livingstonia Secondary School, whose school motto was "I Will Try" (a phrase he used as the title of his most famous book). On graduating from this school in 1958 at about the age of 16, he decided that the only way to achieve a college degree was to go to the US, and he set out on foot to do so. When he reached Kampala in Uganda he saw the name of Skagit Valley College, Washington state, in a US Information service directory, so he applied and was awarded a place and a scholarship. Kayira then embarked on a journey of more than 3000 kilometres and walked to Khartoum, Sudan, where he obtained a visa, and people from Skagit Valley raised the money to bring him over to Washington. He arrived at Skagit Valley two years after setting out. After graduating from Skagit Valley, he went on to study Political Science at the University of Washington in Seattle, and then read History at Cambridge University in the UK. Subsequently he worked as a probation officer and was the author of several novels.

His autobiography, I Will Try, was on the New York Times bestseller list for 16 weeks after its publication in 1965.

He made his home in England, and died in London on 14 October 2012.

In October, 2014, an American charitable organization called "Youth of Malawi" built a primary school in the rural Malawian village of Chimphamba and named it after Legson Kayira.  The Legson Kayira Primary School and Community Center is solar-powered, rainwater harvesting, and boasts an outdoor movie projecter. On October 13, 2016, Legson's ashes were to be interred in Chimphamba Village, during a memorial ceremony attended by his children.

Selected writings

Fiction

 The Looming Shadow, Doubleday, 1967.
 Jingala, Doubleday, 1969.
 Things Black and Beautiful, Doubleday, 1970.
 The Civil Servant, Longman, 1971.
 "Homecoming", in Young and Black in Africa anthology, Random House, 1971.
 The Detainee, Heinemann, 1974.

Nonfiction

 I Will Try (autobiography), Doubleday, 1965 – awarded Northwest Non-Fiction Prize.

Further reading
 Thomas H. Jackson, "Legson Kayira and the Uses of the Grotesque", World Literature Written in English, Vol. 22, No. 2, 1983, pp. 143–151.

Notes

References

External links
 "Mission on the March – A Barefoot Ulysses and His Incredible Odyssey", Unstoppable Enterprises, 2007.

Year of birth uncertain
1942 births
2012 deaths
University of Washington College of Arts and Sciences alumni
Alumni of St Catharine's College, Cambridge
Malawian novelists
Malawian Presbyterians
Autobiographers